José Carlos O'Neill (1 August 1815, in Lisbon, Encarnação (registered 1825) – 21 June 1887, in Lisbon, Encarnação), was the titular head of the Clanaboy O'Neill dynasty, whose family has been in Portugal since the 18th century.

Life
He was the first-born son of the previous head José Maria O'Neill and wife Ludovina de Jesus Alves Solano.

He was a trader and the Main Manager of the Casa Comercial Torlades, who also received in his house in his Farm (Quinta) of as Machadas, at the term of Setúbal, Kings Pedro V of Portugal and Luís I of Portugal.

He died unmarried and without issue. He was succeeded by his second brother Jorge Torlades O'Neill I.

See also
 Irish nobility
 Irish kings
 Irish royal families
 O'Neill (surname)
 Uí Néill, the Irish Dynasty
 Ó Neill Dynasty Today
 O'Neill of Clannaboy

References

External links
 José Carlos O'Neill's Genealogy in a Portuguese Genealogical site
 

Irish lords
1815 births
1887 deaths
Portuguese nobility
Portuguese people of Irish descent
Connachta
O'Neill dynasty
19th-century Portuguese people
People from Lisbon